John Henry Cross (September 25, 1925, Lynn, Massachusetts – November 19, 2010, Silver Spring, Maryland) was an American parasitologist. He served in the Navy in the Solomon Islands, in the Pacific Theater of the war, during World War II. In 1945, as the war drew to a close, he joined the nascent United Nations Relief and Rehabilitation Administration in Shanghai, China where he met his wife, Evelyn Chang. They married in 1952, after returning to the United States for advanced education.

Cross was Scientific Director of Naval Medical Research Unit Two (NAMRU-2) from 1966 to 1984, a professor at the Uniformed Services University of the Health Sciences, where he was appointed an emeritus professor in retirement, and where he continued teaching and inspiring up until his final illness.

References

Citations 
Brown, Emma (2010) "A Local Life: John Cross, 85; parasitologist solved mysterious illness in the Philippines" 'Washington Post' https://www.washingtonpost.com/wp-dyn/content/article/2010/12/25/AR2010122501893_2.html.
Clayton, Charles C. (1971) "Fighters against tropical disease" http://taiwantoday.tw/ct.asp?xItem=135787&ctNode=124
 
https://web.archive.org/web/20101223184648/http://www.astmh.org/source/blog/post.cfm/in-memoriam-john-h-cross
http://www.antimicrobe.org/authors/john_cross.asp
Edwards, Jim (2011) "Obituary: John H Cross, 1925 - 2010" World Veterinary Association 

1925 births
2010 deaths
American parasitologists
United States Navy sailors
United States Navy personnel of World War II
People from Lynn, Massachusetts